Saskia Hamilton (born 1967 Washington, D.C.) is an American poet. She graduated from Kenyon College with a B.A., from New York University with an M.A., and from Boston University with Ph.D. She worked for the Folger Shakespeare Library, and the Lannan Foundation and now teaches at Barnard College. She was a judge for the 2009 Griffin Poetry Prize.

Awards
 Radcliffe Institute for Advanced Study Fellowship
 National Endowment for the Arts Fellowship
 2009 Guggenheim Fellowship

Works
Corridor, Graywolf Press, 2014, 
Canal Arc, 2005, 
Divide These, Graywolf Press, 2005, 
As for Dream, Graywolf Press, 2001,

As editor
The Letters of Robert Lowell Farrar, Straus and Giroux, 2007, 
Words in Air: The Complete Correspondence Between Elizabeth Bishop and Robert Lowell, Editors Thomas Travisano, Saskia Hamilton, Macmillan, 2010,

References in culture
Saskia Hamilton was featured on the tenth track of the 2010 Ben Folds/Nick Hornby collaborative album Lonely Avenue as the subject of an eponymous song.

References

1967 births
Poets from Washington, D.C.
Kenyon College alumni
New York University alumni
Barnard College faculty
Living people
American women poets
Folger Shakespeare Library